Raymentia is a genus of mites in the family Laelapidae.

Species
 Raymentia anomala Womersley, 1956

References

Laelapidae